David Farrod Thompson (born January 13, 1975) is a former American football running back in the National Football League for the St. Louis Rams. He also was a member of the Amsterdam Admirals in NFL Europe. He played college football at Oklahoma State.

Early years
Thompson attended Okmulgee High School where he rushed for 4,995. His junior and senior year saw him eclipse the 2,000 yard mark rushing for 2,500 yards his senior year. He accepted a football scholarship from Oklahoma State University. He was a four-year starter at running back and received All-conference honors as a senior. He is currently the school's third All-time career rushing leader (4,314 yards).

Professional career
Thompson was signed as an undrafted free agent by the St. Louis Rams after the 1997 NFL Draft, because he was considered too small to play professional football.

In 1999, he was allocated by the Rams to the Amsterdam Admirals of NFL Europe. He was the starter at running back, finishing fourth in the league with 503 rushing yards. He also had 3 rushing touchdowns and 22 receptions for 183 yards.

Personal life
Thompson is a Sports Performance Coach / Personal Trainer. He currently owns a HIIT Training Studio/Gym in Dallas Texas called BURN Dallas Fitness Center. He also trains athletes from ages of 7 years old to professional. A gym owner, fitness consultant and professional fitness coach.

References

1975 births
Living people
People from Okmulgee, Oklahoma
Players of American football from Oklahoma
American football running backs
American football return specialists
Oklahoma State Cowboys football players
St. Louis Rams players
Amsterdam Admirals players